The church of Santi Cosma e Damiano is located in central Genoa, Italy

Located at the site of an ancient oratory, it is dedicated to the martyrs St. Cosma and Damian.

The skull and tibia of the latter are presumably among the relics in the church. They were the patron saints of barbers and doctors. The first documents about the church date to 1049.

In 1684, the church roof was damaged by the naval bombardment of the city. It was also damaged during the bombing of Genoa in World War II. It contains a painting of Esther and Assuerus  by Bernardo Castello and a Madonna and child with  St Cosma and Damian  by Gioacchino Assereto.

References

External links
 Diocese website

Cosma e Damiano
Cosma e Damiano